The ICR Discovery Center for Science & Earth History is a creationist museum in Dallas, Texas. Owned and operated by the Institute for Creation Research, the museum opened on September 2, 2019, with 1,600 people visiting on its first day.

The museum cost $37.8 million. The museum promotes young Earth creationist beliefs,  including pseudoscientific arguments linking the Grand Canyon and the Earth's geology to the Genesis flood narrative.

See also
 Creation Museum
 Flood geology

References

External links
Official website
 

2019 establishments in Texas
Creationist museums in the United States
Museums in Dallas
Religious museums in Texas